Walter Francis Forbes (20 January 1858 – 29 March 1933) was an English first-class cricketer.

Forbes was born at Malvern Link in January 1858. He attended Eton College, where he developed a reputation as a good schoolboy cricketer, playing alongside the likes of Alfred and Edward Lyttelton, Ivo Bligh and A. J. Webbe. Unlike his contemporaries, he played little first-class cricket after leaving Eton. His first-class debut came for the Gentlemen of England against Cambridge University at Fenner's in 1877. He played two first-class matches during the 1878 Scarborough Festival, playing for I Zingari against Yorkshire and for the Gentlemen of England against the touring Australians. His association with the Scarborough Festival continued for several years, with Forbes making two appearances in 1879 (including playing for the Gentlemen of the North against the Gentlemen of the South) and one appearance each in 1881 and 1882. He made three first-class appearances in 1883, playing once for the Gentlemen of England and appearing twice for the Gentlemen in the Gentlemen v Players fixtures at The Oval and Lord's. His final first-class appearance came in the 1884 Scarborough Festival for I Zingari against the touring Australians. Across eleven first-class matches, Forbes scored 382 runs at an average of 21.22 and a high score of 80. With his right-arm roundarm fast bowling, he took 31 wickets at a bowling average of 21.90, with best figures of 6 for 32. These figures, one of two five wicket hauls he took, came for I Zingari against the Australians in 1882.

Outside of cricket, he worked as steward for the Dukes of Richmond at Goodwood. He died at Marylebone in March 1933. His father-in-law, Beilby Lawley, also played first-class cricket.

References

External links

1858 births
1933 deaths
People from Malvern Hills District
People educated at Eton College
English cricketers
Gentlemen of England cricketers
I Zingari cricketers
Gentlemen of the North cricketers
Gentlemen cricketers
Sportspeople from Worcestershire